Cockfield may refer to: 

Cockfield, County Durham, a village in County Durham, England
Cockfield, Suffolk, a village in Suffolk, England
Cockfield (Suffolk) railway station
Cockfield Hall, near Yoxford, Suffolk, England
Francis Cockfield, Baron Cockfield (born 1916), an English politician